Pilgrim Media Group (also known as Pilgrim Studios) is a television production company based in North Hollywood, California. It was founded in 1997 by Craig Piligian. It is best known for producing reality television shows for the Discovery Channel. In 2022 Pilgrim became a minority owner in the podcasting company Lionsgate Sound with Lions Gate Entertainment, which launched on October 19, 2022.

Acquisition by Lionsgate
On November 12, 2015, Lions Gate Entertainment created a partnership with Piligian when the studio acquired more than 50% of Pilgrim Studios for $200 million. Piligian retained his position as CEO of the company while Pilgrim continued to operate independently under Piligian. The deal allowed Lionsgate to move into unscripted television programming.

Television series

Amazing America with Sarah Palin
American Casino
American Chopper
American Hot Rod
American Ninja Warrior (Co-production with G4 for Ninja Warrior)
Battlefish
The Big Brain Theory
Bounty Girls
The Cut
Build It Bigger: Rebuilding Greensburg
Covert Action
Cupid
Destroyed In Seconds
Dirty Jobs
Extreme Loggers
Extreme Peril
Fast N' Loud
Firehouse USA: Boston
Full Metal Jousting
Ghost Hunters
Ghost Hunters International
Ghost Hunters Academy
Girl Meets Cowboy
Greensburg
Guilty Or Innocent?
Hazard Pay
Lindsay
Man vs. Cartoon
Master Of Dance
Misfit Garage
NY-SPI Investigates
Only in America with Larry the Cable Guy
Out of the Wild: The Alaska Experiment
Out of the Wild: Venezuela
The Real Exorcist
Really Big Things
Rocco Gets Real
Sandhogs
SEMA: The World's Greatest Car Show
Somebody's Gotta Do It
Southern Steel
Street Customs
Street Outlaws
Strip Search
SWAT: Tactical Force
Swamp Loggers
TapouT
Top Hooker
Top Shot
The Ultimate Fighter
The Ultimate Surfer
UFO Hunters
Worst Case Scenarios (co-produced by Columbia TriStar Domestic Television (later known as Sony Pictures Television)
You Spoof Discovery

References

External links
 

Mass media companies established in 1997
Television production companies of the United States
Lionsgate